Obersimten  is a municipality in Südwestpfalz district, in Rhineland-Palatinate, western Germany and belongs to the municipal association Pirmasens-Land.

Geography 
Obersimten is located west of the Palatinate Forest on the edge of Zweibrücken hill country between Pirmasens in the northeast and Vinningen in the southwest.

References

Municipalities in Rhineland-Palatinate
Südwestpfalz